Kara Marie Lawson (born February 14, 1981) is the head coach of the Duke Blue Devils women's basketball team. She is a former American professional women's basketball player in the Women's National Basketball Association (WNBA) and a basketball television analyst for ESPN and the Washington Wizards. Lawson primarily played as a shooting guard. She won a gold medal at the 2008 Olympics in Beijing, China, a championship with the Sacramento Monarchs in the 2005 WNBA Finals, and coached the United States women's national 3x3 team to gold in the 2020 Summer Olympics. Lawson retired from the WNBA in 2015 to focus on her broadcasting career. She began her coaching career as an assistant coach for the Boston Celtics of the NBA in 2019.

Player career

High school 
Lawson attended Sidwell Friends School her freshman year, then went to West Springfield High School, where she played on the girls' basketball and soccer teams. Lawson was named a WBCA All-American. Her high school record was 83-2 and won 2 State Championships her sophomore and senior years with a perfect 30-0 record. She participated in the 1999 WBCA High School All-America Game, where she scored twenty points, and earned MVP honors.
Naismith Player of the Year

College career
Lawson attended the University of Tennessee (UT) and played for the Lady Vols basketball team, coached by Pat Summitt. She enrolled in UT's College of Business, and graduated in 2003 with a degree in Finance. Lawson received the Frances Pomeroy Naismith Award from the Women's Basketball Coaches Association as the best senior player under 5 ft 8 in (1.7 m). In 2018, Tennessee Governor Bill Haslam named Lawson to the board of trustees of the University of Tennessee, the governing body of the UT system.
In 2003, Lawson was named Arthur Ashe Jr. Sports Scholar by Diverse: Issues In Higher Education.

WNBA
On April 24, 2003, Lawson was selected as the fifth overall pick by the Detroit Shock in the first round of the 2003 WNBA draft. But five days later, the Shock traded Lawson to the Sacramento Monarchs in exchange for Kedra Holland-Corn and a 2004 second-round draft pick. Two years later, Lawson would be a key member of the Monarchs 2005 championship team.

Lawson was a free agent when the Sacramento Monarchs folded prior to the 2010 WNBA season, but later signed a three-year contract with the Connecticut Sun. On March 12, 2014, Lawson was traded to the Washington Mystics for Alex Bentley, who was originally traded to Washington through the Atlanta Dream.

US national team 
Lawson was selected to be a member of the United States national team at the 2001 World University Games held in Beijing, China. After winning the opening game easily, the USA team faced Canada and lost a close game 68–67. Needing a win to remain in medal contention, Lawson scored 25 points to help the USA team defeat Japan, and earn a spot in the quarterfinals. The USA team fell behind by 12 points against undefeated Russia, but came back to win the game by eleven points. The next game was against the unbeaten host team China, and the USA team won 89–78. The USA team won their next two games to set up the gold medal game; a rematch against the host team. China would stay close early, but the USA team prevailed and won the gold medal with a score of 87–67. Lawson was the third leading scorer on the team with 12.0 points per game and led the team in assists and steal with 16 assists and 12 steals over the course of the event.

On July 10, 2008, Lawson was selected to represent the United States with the USA women's national basketball team at the 2008 Summer Olympics in Beijing, China. She helped the United States capture the gold medal, and led the team in points (15) during the gold medal game against Australia, going a perfect 5-5 from the field and 4-4 from the free throw line.

Lawson was invited to the USA Basketball Women's National Team training camp in the fall of 2009. The team selected to play for the 2010 FIBA World Championship and the 2012 Olympics is usually chosen from these participants. At the conclusion of the training camp, the team will travel to Ekaterinburg, Russia, where they compete in the 2009 UMMC Ekaterinburg International Invitational.

Lawson was one of 21 finalists for the U.S. Women's Olympic Basketball Team Roster. The 20 professional women's basketball players, plus one collegiate player (Brittney Griner), were selected by the USA Basketball Women's National Team Player Selection Committee to compete for the final roster to represent the US at the 2012 Olympics in London, United Kingdom. However, Lawson did not make the final roster.

Player statistics

College 

Source

WNBA

Regular season 

|-
| style='text-align:left;'|2003
| style='text-align:left;'|Sacramento
| 34 || 0 || 22.6 || .392 || .400 || .775 || 3.1 || 1.6 || 0.4 || 0.1 || 1.2 || 7.7
|-
| style='text-align:left;'|2004
| style='text-align:left;'|Sacramento
| 34 || 10 || 24.3 || .420 || .381 || .841 || 2.3 || 2.0 || 0.6 || 0.2 || 1.6 || 8.6
|-
| style='text-align:left;'|2005
| style='text-align:left;'|Sacramento
| 24 || 1 || 21.2 || .439 || .444 || .839 || 1.4 || 1.5 || 0.5 || 0.1 || 0.9 || 8.0
|-
| style='text-align:left;'|2006
| style='text-align:left;'|Sacramento
| 34 || 6 || 22.1 || .397 || .398 || .923 || 1.9 || 1.6 || 0.6 || 0.1 || 1.3 || 8.1
|-
| style='text-align:left;'|2007
| style='text-align:left;'|Sacramento
| 34 || 0 || 22.8 || .376 || .338 || .841 || 2.4 || 2.0 || 0.9 || 0.2 || 1.4 || 11.0
|-
| style='text-align:left;'|2008
| style='text-align:left;'|Sacramento
| 32 || 32 || 25.9 || .405 || .432 || .914 || 2.6 || 2.1 || 0.9 || 0.1 || 1.5 || 12.2
|-
| style='text-align:left;'|2009
| style='text-align:left;'|Sacramento
| 25 || 5 || 24.2 || .380 || .336 || .939 || 2.1 || 2.5 || 0.6 || 0.0 || 1.4 || 8.8
|-
| style='text-align:left;'|2010
| style='text-align:left;'|Connecticut
| 34 || 32 || 25.1 || .409 || .359 || .895 || 2.6 || 3.5 || 0.4 || 0.0 || 1.4 || 8.3
|-
| style='text-align:left;'|2011
| style='text-align:left;'|Connecticut
| 33 || 8 || 25.2 || .449 || .430 || .890 || 2.6 || 2.9 || 0.7 || 0.0 || 1.4 || 10.4
|-
| style='text-align:left;'|2012
| style='text-align:left;'|Connecticut
| 34 || 34 || 31.4 || .493 || .430 || .935 || 3.9 || 4.0 || 0.8 || 0.1 || 1.8 || 15.1
|-
| style='text-align:left;'|2013
| style='text-align:left;'|Connecticut
| 9 || 6 || 30.1 || .437 || .458 || .857 || 3.7 || 4.2 || 0.6 || 0.1 || 2.4 || 13.8
|-
| style='text-align:left;'|2014
| style='text-align:left;'|Washington
| 28 || 4 || 21.8 || .379 || .337 || .935 || 2.9 || 2.5 || 0.3 || 0.0 || 1.3 || 7.0
|-
| style='text-align:left;'|2015
| style='text-align:left;'|Washington
| 22 || 21 || 25.0 || .389 || .321 || .938 || 3.0 || 3.6 || 0.6 || 0.1 || 1.1 || 9.6
|-
| style='text-align:left;'|Career
| style='text-align:left;'|13 years, 3 teams
| 377 || 159 || 24.5 || .414 || .390 || .890 || 2.6 || 2.5 || 0.6 || 0.1 || 1.4 || 9.8

Playoffs 

|-
| style='text-align:left;'|2003
| style='text-align:left;'|Sacramento
| 6 || 0 || 25.7 || .214 || .304 || .875 || 3.8 || 2.7 || 1.0 || 0.3 || 0.7 || 5.3
|-
| style='text-align:left;'|2004
| style='text-align:left;'|Sacramento
| 6 || 0 || 25.5 || .370 || .417 || .889 || 2.5 || 1.8 || 8.0 || 0.2 || 0.8 || 9.7
|-
| style='text-align:left;'|2005
| style='text-align:left;'|Sacramento
| 8 || 2 || 26.0 || .433 || .517 || .944 || 3.6 || 2.3 || 8.0 || 0.1 || 1.4 || 11.3
|-
| style='text-align:left;'|2006
| style='text-align:left;'|Sacramento
| 9 || 9 || 32.1 || .448 || .438 || .786 || 3.4 || 1.6 || 9.0 || 0.1 || 1.3 || 12.2
|-
| style='text-align:left;'|2007
| style='text-align:left;'|Sacramento
| 3 || 0 || 25.0 || .500 || .385 || .857 || 2.3 || 3.0 || 3.0 || 0.7 || 0.7 || 12.3
|-
| style='text-align:left;'|2008
| style='text-align:left;'|Sacramento
| 3 || 3 || 27.0 || .478 || .375 || .800 || 5.0 || 4.3 || 2.0 || 0.0 || 2.3 || 9.7
|-
| style='text-align:left;'|2011
| style='text-align:left;'|Connecticut
| 2 || 0 || 18.5 || .400 || .571 || .750 || 0.5 || 3.5 || 0.0 || 0.0 || 1.5 || 7.5
|-
| style='text-align:left;'|2012
| style='text-align:left;'|Connecticut
| 5 || 5 || 35.0 || .442 || .433 || 1.000 || 4.8 || 3.8 || 6.0 || 0.2 || 1.8 || 14.6
|-
| style='text-align:left;'|2014
| style='text-align:left;'|Washington
| 2 || 0 || 26.0 || .526 || .444 || 1.000 || 3.0 || 3.5 || 1.0 || 0.0 || 1.5 || 14.5
|-
| style='text-align:left;'|2015
| style='text-align:left;'|Washington
| 3 || 0 || 16.7 || .353 || .750 || 1.000 || 1.3 || 0.7 || 1.0 || 0.0 || 1.7 || 6.0
|-
| style='text-align:left;'|Career
| style='text-align:left;'|10 years, 3 teams
| 47 || 19 || 27.1 || .413 || .436 || .897 || 3.3 || 2.5 || 39.0 || 0.2 || 1.3 || 10.4

Broadcasting career 
Lawson began her broadcasting career while still playing in the WNBA. She served as a studio analyst for the Sacramento Kings, and worked her way up to working in a variety of NBA and WNBA broadcast roles for ESPN. On January 12, 2007, she was the first woman to work as a nationwide broadcast analyst for an NBA game, when the New Orleans Hornets took on the Washington Wizards.

In 2017, Lawson was named the primary television game analyst for the Washington Wizards, replacing longtime analyst Phil Chenier as full-time host. She is one of the first primary female TV analysts for an NBA team, joining Sarah Kustok of the Brooklyn Nets.

In 2021, Lawson was a commentator for women's basketball at the 2020 Summer Olympics.

Coaching career
On June 27, 2019, the Boston Celtics of the National Basketball Association (NBA) announced that Lawson would join the team as an assistant coach. During her tenure as assistant coach in the 2019–20 season, Lawson worked closely with Marcus Smart, a defensive-minded point guard, as a shooting coach.

On July 11, 2020, it was announced that Lawson was hired as the head coach of the Duke Blue Devils women's basketball team. Her first season as head coach lasted four games after the decision to end the season in late December 2020 due to concerns over the COVID-19 pandemic.

Head coaching record

Personal life
Lawson is married to Damien Barling, whom she met while working in Sacramento soon after the Monarchs' WNBA championship win. They were married in April 2008. Barling is a radio broadcaster in the Sacramento area for ESPN 1320. He also interviewed Lawson on his show following her officially being named as color analyst.

Notes

External links
WNBA Player Profile
WNBA career statistics from Basketball-Reference.com
Kara Lawson's ESPN Bio 

1981 births
Living people
All-American college women's basketball players
American men's basketball coaches
American women's basketball players
Basketball coaches from Virginia
Basketball players at the 2008 Summer Olympics
Basketball players from Virginia
Boston Celtics assistant coaches
College basketball announcers in the United States
Connecticut Sun players
Duke Blue Devils women's basketball coaches
Medalists at the 2008 Summer Olympics
National Basketball Association broadcasters
Olympic gold medalists for the United States in basketball
Point guards
Sacramento Monarchs players
Sportspeople from Alexandria, Virginia
Tennessee Lady Volunteers basketball players
Universiade gold medalists for the United States
Universiade medalists in basketball
Washington Mystics players
Washington Wizards announcers
Women's college basketball announcers in the United States
Women's National Basketball Association All-Stars
Medalists at the 2001 Summer Universiade
United States women's national basketball team players